Carolyn Hamilton may refer to:
 Carolyn Hamilton, England barrister who specialises in children's rights.
 Carolyn Hamilton (historian), South Africa anthropologist and historian.